Slave to the Rhythm may refer to:

Slave to the Rhythm (album), a 1985  album by Grace Jones
"Slave to the Rhythm" (Grace Jones song)
"Slave to the Rhythm" (Michael Jackson song)
Slave to the Rhythm (book), a 1997 book by Liz Jones